The eleventh and final season of Shameless, an American comedy-drama television series based on the British series of the same name by Paul Abbott, premiered on Showtime on December 6, 2020. Showtime announced the series' final season renewal on January 13, 2020.

Plot
After a decade of chaos, the South Side's favorite clan is going with a boom as big questions about their futures emerge when Lip decides to sell the house as gentrification starts to affect Chicago due to the effects of the COVID-19 pandemic. Ian and Mickey adjust to life as a newly married couple. Carl is now part of the corrupt world of Chicago PD. Debbie tries her best to keep the house from selling which causes tension with Lip. Tami and Lip make big decisions as money is tight during the pandemic. Veronica and Kevin decide to start anew in Kentucky. Liam fears he will be left behind. Frank's wild lifestyle finally catches up to him.
Although their final journey will be dangerous, forthcoming changes will force each of them to act or depart. Devolving may come more naturally than evolving in a family where excess never wears off, but the Gallaghers are convinced that they will never grow apart, no matter how old they get.

Cast and characters

Main
 William H. Macy as Frank Gallagher
 Jeremy Allen White as Philip "Lip" Gallagher
 Ethan Cutkosky as Carl Gallagher
 Shanola Hampton as Veronica Fisher
 Steve Howey as Kevin "Kev" Ball
 Emma Kenney as Deborah "Debbie" Gallagher
 Cameron Monaghan as Ian Gallagher
 Noel Fisher as Mickey Milkovich
 Christian Isaiah as Liam Gallagher
 Kate Miner as Tami Tamietti

Recurring
 Paris Newton as Franny Gallagher
 Joshua Malina as Arthur Tipping
 Dennis Cockrum as Terry Milkovich
 Vanessa Bell Calloway as Carol Fisher
 Jim Hoffmaster as Kermit
 Michael Patrick McGill as Tommy
 Scott Michael Campbell as Brad
 Elise Eberle as Sandy Milkovich
 Toks Olagundoye as Leesie Janes
 Chelsea Alden as Tish
 Kimleigh Smith as Sgt. Stamps
 Patrick Sabongui as Martin
 Shakira Barrera as Heidi Cronch

Guest
 Gary Busey as Frank's Father (Hall of Shame)
 Dan Lauria as Maurice "Mo" White (Hall of Shame)
 Melissa Paladino as Cami Tamietti
 Lou Taylor Pucci as Lou Milkovich 
 Tara Buck as Letty
 Richard Portnow as Johnny Boxcars
 Shar Jackson as Constance
 Amanda Payton as Flavia

Episodes

Production
In January 2020, the series was renewed for its eleventh and final season to consist of 12 episodes and was scheduled to premiere in summer 2020. Filming and the premiere date were pushed back due to the COVID-19 pandemic, and filming instead began in September 2020. 

On December 14, 2020, Showtime announced a six-episode limited series retrospective that would air during season 11 called Shameless Hall of Shame; it contains new and original Shameless scenes juxtaposed with a retrospective look at each character's journey during the prior 10 seasons:

Episode 1: Ian & Mickey: Daddy Issues (aired December 27, 2020)
Episode 2: Kev & V: God Doesn't Give with Both Hands (aired January 3, 2021)
Episode 3: Lip: Once Upon a Phillip Gallagher (aired January 17, 2021)
Episode 4: Debbie, Carl & Liam: They Grow Up So Fast (aired January 24, 2021)
Episode 5: Fiona: Go Fiona On Them (aired February 21, 2021)
Episode 6: Frank: Ghosts of Gallagher Past (aired February 28, 2021)

Reception

Critical response
The eleventh season of Shameless has received average reviews from critics. On Rotten Tomatoes, the season has a 70% approval rating with an average score of 5.10 out of 10 based on 10 reviews.

Ratings

References

External links
 
 

Shameless (American TV series)
2020 American television seasons
2021 American television seasons